Umbilicaria esculenta is a lichen of the genus Umbilicaria that grows on rocks, also known as rock tripe. It can be found in  East Asia including in China, Japan, and Korea. It is edible when properly prepared and has been used as a food source and medicine. It is called  iwatake (kanji: 岩茸 or 石茸) in Japanese and seogi (hangul: 석이; hanja: 石耳; literally "stone ear" or "rock ear") or seogi beoseot (hangul: 석이버섯; literally "stone ear mushroom") in Korean.
The species name is based on the earlier basionym Gyrophora esculenta.

In vitro antiviral activity
Polysaccharides from the lichen have been shown to inhibit replication of the HIV virus in laboratory tests.

Gallery

References

 

esculenta
Lichen species
Edible fungi
Lichens described in 1893
Fungi used in traditional Chinese medicine